Dominik Scheil (born 12 December 1989) is a German footballer who plays as a defender for TSV Vordorf.

Career
Scheil made his professional debut for Eintracht Braunschweig in the 3. Liga on 5 October 2008, coming on as a substitute in the 90+1st minute for Fait-Florian Banser in the 1–1 away draw against Dynamo Dresden.

Personal life
Scheil's father Heinz-Günter is a former football and manager, having also played professionally for Eintracht Braunschweig.

References

External links
 Profile at DFB.de
 Profile at kicker.de

1989 births
Living people
Sportspeople from Braunschweig
Footballers from Lower Saxony
German footballers
Association football defenders
Eintracht Braunschweig II players
Eintracht Braunschweig players
3. Liga players